Badanaguppe is a railway station on Mysore–Chamarajanagar branch line.
The station is located in Chamarajanagar district, Karnataka state, India.

Location
Badanaguppe railway station is located near Badanaguppe village in Mysore district.

History 

The project cost . The gauge conversion work of the  stretch was completed.
There are six trains running forward and backward in this route.  Five of them are slow moving passenger trains.

Services
There are trains to Mysore at 7.03 am, 10.50am, 5.00pm, 6.03pm and 8.55 pm. There are trains to Chamarajanagar at 5.50 am, 7.50 am, 9.45 am, 11.10am, 1.10pm, 3.10pm and 7.10pm.

References

Railway stations in Chamarajanagar district
Mysore railway division